Micah Alexander Abernathy (born February 10, 1997) is an American football free safety for the Atlanta Falcons of the National Football League (NFL). He played college football at Tennessee, and originally signed with the Minnesota Vikings as an undrafted free agent in 2019. He has also played for the Tampa Bay Buccaneers, Indianapolis Colts, and Green Bay Packers of the NFL,  the Dallas Renegades of the XFL, and the Houston Gamblers of the United States Football League (USFL).

Personal life and high school
Micah Abernathy was born on February 10, 1997. He was a four-star recruit of the Class of 2015, as the 233rd prospect and the 25th best cornerback prospect nationally on 247Sports. Abernathy's grandfather is the 20th-century civil rights activist, Ralph Abernathy. He committed to the University of Tennessee on October 10, 2014.

College career
Abernathy played at the University of Tennessee from 2015 to 2018 under head coaches Butch Jones and Jeremy Pruitt.

During his freshman year, he played in all 12 games, playing the nickel position and kick returner. He switched to safety in 2016, starting 10 games for the Volunteers. He tied the team lead for interceptions (2) and passes defended (6), ranked second in tackles (69) and led the team in fumbles recovered (3). In 2017, he started all 12 games at safety and ranked third on the team in tackles (81) but had no interceptions and only 2 passes defensed. The following year, in his final season, he started 8 games at safety, missing 4 with an injury, and again recording no interceptions (and only 1 pass defensed).

Professional career

Abernathy was graded by NFL analyst Lance Zierlein as a "priority free agent" prior to the draft, remarking that he had the requisite size, speed and athleticism across multiple secondary positions, but noted that he lacked awareness, instincts, and tackling ability expected.

Minnesota Vikings
After going undrafted in the 2019 NFL Draft, Abernathy signed as an undrafted free agent for the Minnesota Vikings.  Abernathy was released by the Vikings on July 24, 2019.

Tampa Bay Buccaneers
On August 11, 2019, Abernathy signed with the Tampa Bay Buccaneers. The Buccaneers waived Abernathy on August 14, 2019.

Indianapolis Colts
On August 26, 2019, the Indianapolis Colts signed Abernathy. He was released on August 31, 2019.

Dallas Renegades
Abernathy played for the Dallas Renegades of the XFL during the 2020 season.

Houston Gamblers
Abernathy played for the Houston Gamblers of the USFL during the 2022 season.

Green Bay Packers
On August 10, 2022, the Green Bay Packers signed Abernathy following injuries to safeties Darnell Savage, Vernon Scott and Dallin Leavitt. Abernathy played well in his first pre-season appearance against the New Orleans Saints, recording an interception and a tackle for loss on a screen pass. He was named to the 53-man roster by the Packers on August 30, 2022, as the fifth safety on the depth chart. On August 31, 2022, he was released. He was signed to the practice squad two days later. He was elevated from the practice squad to the active roster and made his NFL debut in week one of the regular season, playing on six special teams snaps in the 7–23 loss to the Minnesota Vikings. On December 3, 2022, he was once again elevated for gameday.

Atlanta Falcons
On December 31, 2022, Abernathy was signed by the Atlanta Falcons off the Packers practice squad.

NFL career statistics

Regular season

References

External links

Atlanta Falcons bio
Tennessee Volunteers bio

1997 births
Living people
American football safeties
Tennessee Volunteers football players
Minnesota Vikings players
Tampa Bay Buccaneers players
Indianapolis Colts players
Dallas Renegades players
Houston Gamblers (2022) players
Green Bay Packers players
Atlanta Falcons players
Players of American football from Atlanta